Phineas Maimela (born 19 September 1978) is a Botswana former footballer who played as a midfielder. He played for the Botswana national football team between 1997 and 2000.

External links

Association football midfielders
Botswana footballers
Botswana international footballers
1978 births
Living people
Extension Gunners FC players